Arno Nadel (October 5, 1878 – March 1943) was a Lithuanian musicologist, composer, playwright, poet, and painter.

Early life 
Nadel was born in Vilnius, Lithuania, at the time of his birth, part of the Russian Empire, to an Orthodox Jewish family.

Career 
In 1890, Nadel moved from Lithuania to Germany. At the age of 12, Nadel studied in Königsberg, Germany, under the cantor Eduard Birnbaum. He also studied with conductor and composer Robert Schwalm.

In 1895, when he was 17 years old, he moved to Berlin and enrolled in the Hochschule für die Wissenschaft des Judentums. He studied with composer Ludwig Mendelssohn and Max Lowengard.

After graduating he worked at the Kottbusser Ufer Synagogue (Synagoge am Kottbusser Ufer) as an educator and choirmaster. In 1916, he became choir director of the Jewish community of Berlin which included the supervision of music at all Berlin synagogues.

Nadel was also a very prolific playwright and poet. Starting in 1918, Nadel took up painting as well, painting several self-portraits and biblical scenes.

In 1922, at the request of Jewish leadership, Nadel worked for years on an anthology of synagogue music, Kompendium Hallelujah! Gesänge für den jüdischen Gottesdienst, which he finished in 1938 and intended to publish in seven volumes.

Before he was deported, Nadel was able to leave his large collection of old Jewish liturgical materials with a non-Jewish neighbor, some of which survived and were purchased by his friend Eric Mandell. What remains of these materials is held at Gratz College in Philadelphia.

Personal life 
Nadel was married to Beate Anna Nadel.

He was a resident of Schöneberg quarter of Berlin. In November 1938, he was sent to the Sachsenhausen concentration camp. Although Nadel was lucky enough to get papers to leave for England, he was too frail to make the trip. In March 1943, he and his wife were deported to the Auschwitz extermination camp. He died there the same year.

Published works 
 Nadel, Arno. Aus vorletzten und letzten Gründen. Berlin: E. Fleischel, 1909. 
 Nadel, Arno. Cagliostro drama in fünf akten. Berlin: Neuer deutscher Verlag, 1913. 
 Nadel, Arno. Um dieses alles Gedichte. München: G. Müller, 1914. 
 Nadel, Arno. Adam Drama in einem Vorspiel und vier Akten. Leipzig: Insel, 1917. 
 Nadel, Arno, and Jacob Steinhardt. Jacob Steinhart. Berlin: Verlag Neue Kunsthandlung, 1920. 
 Budko, Joseph, and Arno Nadel. Das Jahr des Juden : zwoelf Gedichte zu zwoelf Radierungen. Berlin: Verlag fuer juedische Kunst und Kultur Fritz Gurlitt, 1920. 
 Nadel, Arno, and Jacob Steinhardt. "Rot und glühend ist das Auge des Juden" gedichte zu 8 Radierungen von Jacob Steinhart. Berlin: Verlag für Jüdische Kunst und Kultur, F. Gurlitt, 1920. 
 Nadel, Arno. Der Sündenfall sieben biblische Szenen. Berlin: Jüdischer Verlag, 1920. 
 Nadel, Arno, and Felix Stössinger. Der Ton. Leipzig: Insel-verlag, 1921. 
 Nadel, Arno, and Hans Steiner. Das gotische ABC. Berlin: F. Gurlitt, 1923. 
 Nadel, Arno. Heiliges Proletariat: fünf Bücher der Freiheit und der Liebe. Konstanz: O. Wöhrle, 1924. 
 Nadel, Arno. Die Erlösten 10 Totenmasken ; Radierungen mit 2 Gedichten d. Künstlers. Berlin: Franz Schneider Verl, 1924. 
 Nadel, Arno. Tänze und Beschwörungen des weissagenden Dionysos [Den Besuchern d. Balls d. Bücherfreunde übergeben, am 27. März 1925]. Berlin: Felix Stössinger, 1925. 
 Nadel, Arno, and Ludwig Marcuse. Drei Augen-Blicke: der schöne Gottfried. Berlin: Düwell & Franke, 1932. 
 Nadel, Arno. Das Leben des Dichters. Berlin: Numerierter Privatdruck, 1935. 
 Nadel, Arno. Der weissagende Dionysos Gedichtwerk. Heidelberg: L. Schneider, 1959.

As editor 
 Nadel, Arno. Jontefflieder. Berlin: Jüdischer Verlag, 1919. Musical score. 
 Nadel, Arno. Jüdische Volkslieder. Berlin: Jüdischer Verlag, 1920. 
 Nadel, Arno. Jüdische Liebeslieder (Volkslieder). Berlin: Harz, 1923. 
 Nadel, Arno, Abraham Maurice Silbermann, and Erwin Singer. Haggādā le-yelādîm = Die Haggadah des Kindes. Berlin: Hebr. Verl. "Menorah", 1936. 
 Nadel, Arno. Zemirōt sǎbat die häuslichen Sabbatgesänge. Berlin: Schocken, 1937.

Translations 
 Lewin, Samuel. Chassidische Legende. Rathenau u. Horodisch, 1925. 
 An-Ski, S., and Arno Nadel. Der Dybuk; dramatische legende in vier Akten. Berlin: Verlag Ost und West, L. Winz, 1921.

Bibliography 
 Kasack, Hermann. "Arno Nadel." Mosaiksteine: Beiträge zur Literatur und Kunst. Frankfurt am Main: Suhrkamp, 1956. pp. 243–248. 
 Christine Zahn: Wer den Maler Arno Nadel noch nicht kennt, weiß von dem Dichter und findet in ihm den Musiker wieder. In: Juden in Kreuzberg. Edition Hentrich, Berlin: 1991.  
 Jascha Nemtsov: Arno Nadel. Sein Beitrag zur jüdischen Musikkultur. Hentrich & Hentrich Verlag, Berlin: 2008. . 
 Lexikon deutsch-jüdischer Autoren. Band 17, de Gruyter, Berlin: 2009. S. 250–257.  
 Kerstin Schoor: Vom literarischen Zentrum zum literarischen Ghetto: deutsch-jüdische literarische Kultur in Berlin zwischen 1933 und 1945. Wallstein, Göttingen: 2010.  
 Nemtsov, Jascha, and Jos Porath. Arno Nadel: His Contribution to Jewish Musical Culture. Berlin: Hentrich & Hentrich, 2013. English translation of 2008 book above.

References

External links 
Literature by and about Arno Nadel in University Library JCS Frankfurt am Main: Digital Collections Judaica
 Hymne auf Beethoven zum 17 Dez. 1920 by Arno Nadel at the Leo Baeck Institute, New York
 
 
 Arno Nadel Archive at National Library of Israel
 Eric Mandell Collection at Gratz College

Jewish painters
Jewish composers
Jewish musicologists
Jewish poets
Jewish dramatists and playwrights
German people who died in Auschwitz concentration camp
1878 births
1943 deaths
20th-century Lithuanian painters
Lithuanian Jews who died in the Holocaust
Hochschule für die Wissenschaft des Judentums alumni